USS Racer is a name used more than once by the United States Navy:

 , a schooner used in the American Civil War.
 , a patrol craft placed in service 27 May 1943.

United States Navy ship names